Web log analysis software (also called a web log analyzer) is a kind of web analytics software that parses a server log file from a web server, and based on the values contained in the log file, derives indicators about when, how, and by whom a web server is visited. Reports are usually generated immediately, but data extracted from the log files can alternatively be stored in a database, allowing various reports to be generated on demand.

Features supported by log analysis packages may include "hit filters", which use pattern matching to examine selected log data.

Common indicators

 Number of visits and number of unique visitors
 Visit duration and last visits
 Authenticated users, and last authenticated visits
 Days of week and rush hours
 Domains/countries of host's visitors.
 Hosts list
 Number of page views
 Most viewed, entry, and exit pages
 File types
 OS used
 Browsers used
 Robots used
 HTTP referrer
 Search engines, key phrases and keywords used to find the analyzed web site
 HTTP errors
 Some of the log analyzers also report on who is on the site, conversion tracking, visit time and page navigation.

See also 
 List of web analytics software

External links